Virginia's 11th congressional district is a U.S. congressional district in the Commonwealth of Virginia. Situated in the Northern Virginia suburbs of Washington, D.C., the district comprises most of Fairfax County and the entirety of Fairfax City. The district is represented by Democrat Gerry Connolly.

The Hill newspaper quotes census data to conclude that Virginia's 11th district was the wealthiest congressional district in the nation from 2003 to 2013. The article attributed the wealth to the many lobbyists and two-career couples in Northern Virginia.

Composition
The district last existed in what is now West Virginia's 1st district and was held by Jacob B. Blair before the events of the U.S. Civil War. Virginia did not have an 11th district until it was re-created after the 1990 United States Census from portions of the old 8th and 10th districts because of explosive growth in Northern Virginia. It was intended to be a "fair fight" district; indeed, it encompassed most of the more Democratic portions of the old 10th district and the more Republican portions of the old 8th district.

George W. Bush only narrowly defeated John Kerry here in 2004, while Democratic Governor Tim Kaine and Democratic Senator Jim Webb both carried this district, in 2005 and 2006 respectively. In 2008, Barack Obama won this district over Republican Senator John McCain.  Democrat Leslie L. Byrne briefly held the seat for the first election cycle of the new district, but was quickly defeated in 1994 by Republican Tom Davis.  Davis established a secure hold on the district during his tenure (1995–2008), but Democrat Gerald Connolly won it when Davis stepped down.

Both Davis and Connolly may have been aided by their previous service on the Board of Supervisors of Fairfax County, where most of the 11th district's population is concentrated.  61.5% of 11th congressional district residents live in Fairfax County. The results of the 2010 United States Census showed this district's population continued to grow, and due to redistricting covered more urban areas in Northern Virginia to favor the incumbent, Connolly.

Recent electoral history

1992-1998s

2000s

2010s

2020s

Statewide elections 
Data on election results for Virginia districts can be found via the Virginia Department of Elections.

List of members representing the district

Historical district boundaries

See also

Virginia's congressional districts
List of United States congressional districts
Virginia's 11th congressional district election, 2010

Notes

References

 
 
 Congressional Biographical Directory of the United States 1774–present

External links
 Rep. Gerry Connolly's Official Website
 Eleventh Congressional District Democratic Committee official website
 Eleventh Congressional District Republican Committee official website

11
1793 establishments in Virginia
Constituencies established in 1793
Constituencies disestablished in 1863
1863 disestablishments in Virginia
Constituencies established in 1993
1993 establishments in Virginia